Schizothorax edeniana is a species of ray-finned fish in the genus Schizothorax from Afghanistan.

References 

Schizothorax
Fish described in 1842